Erin Koegel is an American politician serving in the Minnesota House of Representatives since 2017. A member of the Minnesota Democratic–Farmer–Labor Party (DFL), Koegel represents District 39A in the northern Twin Cities metropolitan area, which includes the city of Fridley and parts of Anoka and Ramsey Counties in Minnesota.

Early life, education, and career
Koegel was born in Duluth, Minnesota and raised in Maple Grove, Minnesota. She graduated from Osseo High School in 2000. She attended the University of Minnesota Duluth, graduating with a Bachelor of Applied Science in psychology and a minor in political science, and later with a master's degree in advocacy and political leadership. She is a volunteer coordinator.

Minnesota House of Representatives
Koegel was elected to the Minnesota House of Representatives in 2016, after incumbent Jerry Newton retired to run for a seat in the Minnesota State Senate, and has been reelected every two years since. From 2021-2022,,Koegel served as vice-chair of the Transportation Finance and Policy Committee. Koegel is the chair of the Sustainable Infrastructure Policy Committee and sits on the Commerce Finance and Policy and Transportation Finance and Policy Committees.

Koegel is the co-author of the bill that would restrict wake boats within 200 feet of shore, prohibit wake boats on lakes 50 acres or less and on waterways that are less than 500 feet wide.

Electoral history

Personal life
Koegel is married to Steve and resides in Spring Lake Park, Minnesota. Her daughter, Clara, was born in 2018.

On August 22, 2021, Koegel accidentally severed her middle, ring, and little fingers on her left hand in a power saw accident. She was airlifted to the North Memorial Health Hospital in Robbinsdale, where she underwent emergency surgery. Surgeons were able to re-attach her middle finger, but her ring and pinky fingers were lost. A GoFundMe page set up to support Koegel's recovery surpassed its goal of $5,000, however it attracted the notice of officials when it appeared that many contributions came from lobbyists. Minnesota state law prohibits gifts from lobbyists to lawmakers worth more than $5. The GoFundMe page announced that any gifts from lobbyists would be returned immediately.

References

External links

 Official House of Representatives website
 Official campaign website

1980s births
Living people
Democratic Party members of the Minnesota House of Representatives
21st-century American politicians
21st-century American women politicians
Women state legislators in Minnesota
Politicians from Duluth, Minnesota
People from Maple Grove, Minnesota
People from Spring Lake Park, Minnesota